The Hochschwab in the Upper Styria is a mountain, and the highest summit in the eponymous mountain range.

Location 
The summit of the Hochschwab is a flat, rock and grass-covered dome, that may easily be climbed from the Schiestlhaus to the northeast in about half an hour via the plateau to the west (Biwakschachtel Fleischerhütte). The Schiestlhaus may be approached from Seewiesen at the foot of the Steirischer Seeberg via the Seetal valley, the Untere Dullwitz to the Voisthaler Hut, the Obere Dullwitz and the Graf-Meran-Steig, as well as from the north, from Weichselboden in the Salza valley.

The showpiece of the Hochschwab is its mighty south face which has a width of almost two kilometres and rises to a height of up to 300 metres above the Trawies Saddle and the valleys of Trawiestal (to the southwest) and Obere Dullwitz (to the southeast) which meet at that point. There are climbing routes of all grades up the south face.

1988 Hochschwab tragedy 
In early November 1988 there was a mountaineering tragedy on the Hochschwab, which triggered the biggest search operation ever undertaken by the Styrian mountain rescue service to that date. A seven-man group was trapped for 2 days and nights in storms and icy temperatures at a height of 2,000 metres above sea level. Following the deployment of 150 Alpine gendarmes and mountain rescue personnel as well as five helicopters, five of the party were already found to be dead and the remaining two survived with serious injuries.

References

Notes

Literature 
 Liselotte Buchenauer: Hochschwab, 1960 und mehrere Neuauflagen. 
 Rudolf Ägyd Lindner: Hochschwab, Weishaupt, 2nd edition, 2002. 
 Peter Rieder: Alpenvereinsführer Hochschwab. Bergverlag Rudolf Rother, Munich, 1976.

External links 
 
 VR Panoramic photographs of the Hochschwab Mountains
 

Two-thousanders of Austria
Mountains of the Alps
Mountains of Styria